Through These Reins and Gone is the 2006 debut release from The Felice Brothers.

Track listing
"Trailer Song" (sung by Simone Felice)
"Ballad of Lou the Welterweight"
"Hey Hey Revolver"
"Your Belly in My Arms"
"Got What I Need"
"Soldiers Song"
"Valentines Song"
"Roll On Arte"
"Christmas Song"
"Mercy"
"Song to Die To"
"Going Going Gone"

The Felice Brothers albums
2006 albums